Patio Island is a small island of Papua New Guinea, located to the southeast of New Hanover Island, to the north-west of New Ireland.  Senta Pass separates it from Tsoilaunung Island to the north. To the south is Baudisson Island.

References

Islands of Papua New Guinea